Will Hackney is an American musician and co-founder of Trekky Records.  He has contributed to many North Carolina indie rock and folk bands, including Wye Oak, Lost in the Trees, Bowerbirds, Mount Moriah, and Loamlands. Hackney is a multi-instrumentalist, known for playing bass, mandolin, guitar, organ, cornet and many other instruments for his various projects. He co-founded Trekky Records in 2001 with Martin Anderson, later releasing records by artists including Sylvan Esso, Phil Cook, and Lost in the Trees.

References

American indie rock musicians
Folk musicians from North Carolina
Living people
Year of birth missing (living people)